Phyllocolpa is a genus of insects belonging to the family Tenthredinidae.

The species of this genus are found in Europe and Northern America.

Species:
 Phyllocolpa acutiserra (Lindqvist, 1949) 
 Phyllocolpa alienata (Foerster, 1854)

References

Tenthredinidae
Sawfly genera